The women's 52 kg competition in judo at the 2016 Summer Olympics in Rio de Janeiro was held on 7 August at the Carioca Arena 2.

The gold and silver medals were determined by a single-elimination tournament, with the winner of the final taking gold and the loser receiving silver.  Judo events awarded two bronze medals.  Quarterfinal losers competed in a repechage match for the right to face a semifinal loser for a bronze medal (that is, the judokas defeated in quarterfinals A and B competed against each other, with the winner of that match facing the semifinal loser from the other half of the bracket).

The medals for the competition were presented by Thomas Bach, Germany, president of the International Olympic Committee and the gifts were presented by Marius Vizer, president of the International Judo Federation.

A controversy emerged that Joud Fahmy from Saudi Arabia gave up of her first round fight to avoid facing Israeli Gili Cohen. The Saudi Olympic team dismissed the controversy and tweeted that Fahmy had sustained injuries to her arm and leg during training and was advised by medical staff not to compete.

Results

Finals
{{Round4
|team-width=200
|score-width=30

|||000||000
|||000||000

|||000|'''

Repechages

Pool A

Pool B

Pool C

Pool D

References

External links
 

W52
Judo at the Summer Olympics Women's Half Lightweight
Women's events at the 2016 Summer Olympics
Olympics W52